Lussana is a surname. Notable people with the surname include:

Costante Lussana (1892–1944), Italian long-distance runner 
Filippo Lussana (1820–1897), Italian physiologist